An Ace-Ten game is a type of card game, highly popular in Europe, in which the Aces and Tens are of particularly high value.

Description 
Many of Europe's most popular card games feature the Ace-Ten scoring system, where the cards count as Ace = 11, Ten = 10, King = 4, Queen or Ober = 3, Jack or Unter = 2. Pip cards below the Ten generally have no card point value and the pack is often shortened by removing the lower pip cards or 'non-counters'. This means that, in a typical shortened pack of between 20 and 36 cards, there are 120 card points and thus a winning total is typically 61 points. Wins are doubled for scoring three-quarters of the total points and trebled for winning every trick, a scoring system known as the Skat schedule after its "most illustrious" example, the German national game of Skat.

There are 3 branches of the Ace-Ten family:
 Schafkopf group. The trump suit is bolstered by the promotion of all Unters (Jacks) or all Obers (Queens) or both to be permanent top trumps.
 Marriage group. Bonuses are added for melding a 'marriage' or 'pair' comprising a King and Queen or King and Ober of the same suit. In many cases, bonuses are awarded for other melds and for taking the last trick.
 Jass group. The trump Jack and trump Nine are permanent top trumps, typically known as Jass and Nell. There are usually bonuses for various melds and taking the last trick.

The historical English game of Losing Lodam uses a similar scoring system, but the courts are worth one point less i.e. the King is 3 points, the Queen 2 and the Knave 1.

History 
Although the origin of Ace-Ten games is uncertain, scholars have proposed a number of theories. In 1980, Sir Michael Dummett argued that they were most likely to have been invented by users of French cards in the Netherlands area, a hypothesis supported by the Dutch origin of the Swiss national game of Jass. In 2000, John McLeod wrote that we can trace their development "from Brisque and Mariage in the 16th century along various paths to produce 66 and Tyziacha, Maria Ulti, Schafkopf, Doppelkopf and Skat, as well as the Jass games."

Despite claims for the invention of 66 at Paderborn in 1652, it is not recorded until 1715 although Kozietulski stated in 1888 that it had been popular in Poland for two centuries which dates its appearance there to the late 17th century and he doubts it is of Polish origin on account of its French name and the marriage feature which appears in old French games. 

The earliest recorded rules for a game with a form of Ace-Ten scheme date to around 1672 when Willughby published the only known description of the old English game of Losing Lodam, a negative game in which the aim was not to collect cards with penalty points. However Losing Lodam is mentioned as early as 1586 and may be the same as the game of coquinbert qui gagne perd (..."he who wins loses") listed by Rabelais in 1534. Another early example is the French game of Brusquembille whose rules appeared in 1718.

Probably around 1820, the Ten was promoted from its natural position between the Jack and the Nine to take its place between the Ace and King. So in most Ace-Ten games the Tens are high. A few games retain the natural ranking in which Tens are low, an indication that they are older: 
 German Schafkopf and Bauerchen
 Mariage
 Reunion and Hindersche
 Loosing Loadum

Games with national or regional status 
Many Ace-Ten games have achieved national or regional status. They are usually played with cards typical of their particular country or region. These include:

 Belote, France's national card game, very similar to Dutch Klaberjass (see below)
 Binokel, Württemberg's national card game
 Briscola, one of Italy's most popular games
 Jass, Switzerland's national game
 Klaberjass, the Dutch invented "international, classic two-hander"
 Mariáš, Czechoslovakia's national game
 Pinochle, USA, an "American classic"
 Schafkopf, Bavaria's national game
 Schnapsen, Austria's national game
 Skat, Germany's national game
 Sueca, Portugal's most famous card game
 Tute, Spain's national game
 Zole, Latvia's national game

Other Ace-Ten games
Other well known Ace-Tenners include:

 Bezique, "one of the most illustrious games of European high society"
 Brusquembille, rules first recorded in 1718.
 Doppelkopf, Northern Germany
 Einwerfen, an early ancestor of Ace-Ten games
 Losing Lodam, with the earliest recorded rules of an Ace-Ten system (1672).
 Mariage, oldest known game of the Marriage family of Ace-Ten games
 Russian Schnapsen or 1000, a 24-card variant played in Russia
 Six-Bid, modern American game derived from Tarock
 Sixty-Six, Bavaria, Germany
 Tarock, Germany

See also 
 Marriage group
 Jack–Nine games

Footnotes

References

Bibliography